Enniscorthy RFC is a rugby union club based in Enniscorthy, County Wexford in Ireland. As of 2023, it fields teams in Division 2B of the All-Ireland League, having been promoted from Division 2C in 2022. Its clubhouse and pitch are located on the Ross Road in Enniscorthy. Founded in 1912, it is one of the oldest rugby clubs in County Wexford.

The club won the last Leinster Junior Challenge Cup in 1925, and went on to win the successor Leinster Rugby Provincial Towns Cup several times, including in 2012, 2015, 2018, and 2019. It has also twice won the Irish Rugby All Ireland Junior Cup (in 2014 and 2016).

Enniscorthy RFC was voted "club of the year" at the 2022 Guinness Rugby Writers Awards.

References

External links

Irish rugby union teams
Rugby clubs established in 1912
Enniscorthy
Rugby union clubs in County Wexford
1912 establishments in Ireland
Senior Irish rugby clubs (Leinster)